The Belarus men's national under-18 ice hockey team is the men's national under-18 ice hockey team of Belarus. The team is controlled by the Belarus Ice Hockey Federation, a member of the International Ice Hockey Federation. The team represented Belarus at the IIHF World U18 Championships.

Due to the 2022 Russian invasion of Ukraine, the International Ice Hockey Federation banned all Belarusian national and club teams from its events indefinitely, and Hockey Canada banned Belarus’s “participation in events held in Canada that do not fall under the IIHF’s jurisdiction.”

International competitions

IIHF World U18 Championships

WJC U18 Championship Record (1999–2021)

References

External links
Belarus at IIHF.com

Under
National under-18 ice hockey teams